The discography of Mexican rock band Panda consists of seven studio albums, one extended plays, two live albums, three compilation albums, one demo albums, twenty seven singles and twenty seven music videos.

Albums

Studio albums

Live albums

Compilation albums

Demo albums

Extended plays

Singles

Guest appearances

Music videos
 Buen Día (2000)
 Si Supieras (2000)
 Te Invito a mi Fiesta (2001)
 Hola! (2002)
 Maracas (2002)
 Ya no Jalaba (2003)
 Quisiera no Pensar (2003)
 Cita en el Quirófano (2005)
 Cuando no es Como Debiera Ser (2005)
 Disculpa los Malos Pensamientos (2006)
 Narcisista por Excelencia (2006)
 Los Malaventurados no Lloran (2007)
 Procedimientos Para Llegar a un Común Acuerdo (2007)
 Nunca Nadie Nos Podrá Parar (Gracias) (2007)
 Muñeca (Sinfonía Soledad) (2008)
 Solo a Terceros (2009)
 Adheridos Separados (2009)
 Nuestra Aflicción (2010)
 Feliz Cumpleaños (MTV Unplugged) (2010)
 Los Malaventurados no Lloran (MTV Unplugged) (2011)
 Envejecido en Barril de Roble (2012)
 Romance en Re Sostenido (2012)
 La Noche de la Mesa Triste (2012)
 Enfermedad En Casa (2013)
 Saludos Desde Turquía (2014)
 Usted (2014)
 Libre Pastoreo (2014)

References

External links
Panda at AllMusic

Discographies of Mexican artists
Punk rock discographies